Cornelis Arie "Kees" Verkerk (born 28 October 1942) is a former speed skater from the Netherlands.

Short biography
Kees Verkerk was World Allround Champion in 1966 and 1967, and European Allround Champion in 1967. He won an Olympic gold medal on the 1,500 m in 1968 and a silver medal on the 5,000 m. Four years earlier (in 1964), he had won Olympic silver on the 1,500 m. In 1972, he won Olympic silver on the 10,000 m. Nationally, he won four Allround titles in 1966, 1967, 1969 and 1972. As a result of his performances, he received the Oscar Mathisen Award in 1966 and 1967, the first skater to win this award twice, although until 1967, skaters were not eligible to win it more than once.

In 1973, together with Ard Schenk and a dozen other skaters, Verkerk joined in a newly formed professional league, but this lasted only two years. The end of this professional league also marked the end of Verkerk's career as a speed skater. Later, he was coach of the Swedish team. Verkerk met his future Norwegian wife in 1972 and has lived in Norway since his speed skating career ended.

World records
Over the course of his career, Verkerk skated eight world records:

Source: SpeedSkatingStats.com

Personal records

!Discipline!!Result!!Date!!Location!!Note

Verkerk has an Adelskalender score of 168.033 points. Except for two days in February 1968, he was number one on the Adelskalender from 28 February 1967 until 5 February 1971 – a total of 1444 days. The Adelskalender is an all-time allround speed skating ranking.

Source: SpeedSkatingStats.com

Tournament overview

 ISSL= International Speed Skating League
source:

Medals won

References

Notes

Bibliography

 Bal, Rien and Van Dijk, Rob. Schaatskampioenen, alles over het seizoen 68–69 (Speedskating Champions, all about the season 68–69) . Amsterdam, the Netherlands: N.V. Het Parool, 1969. (Dutch)
 Bestebreurtje, Ger. Heya Keessie – Verkerk vertelt. Deventer, the Netherlands: Uitgeverij N.Kluwer N.V., 1969.
 Eng, Trond. All Time International Championships, Complete Results: 1889 – 2002. Askim, Norway: WSSSA-Skøytenytt, 2002.
 Froger, Fred R. Topsporters: Ard Schenk * Kees Verkerk (Elite  Athletes: Ard Schenk * Kees Verkerk). Bussum, the Netherlands: Van Holkema  & Warendorf, 1967. (Dutch)
 ___  Winnaars op de schaats (Victors on Skates), Een Parool Sportpocket. Amsterdam, the Netherlands: N.V. Het Parool, 1968. (Dutch)
 Koomen, Theo. 10 Jaar Topschaatsen (10 Years Elite Speedskating). Laren (NH), the Netherlands: Uitgeverij Luitingh, 1971. . (Dutch)
 _ Topschaatsen 1972 (Elite Speedskating 1972). Laren (NH), the Netherlands: Uitgeverij Luitingh, 1972. . (Dutch)
 _ Topschaatsen 3 (Elite Speedskating 3). Laren (NH), the Netherlands: Uitgeverij Luitingh, 1973. . (Dutch)
 Maaskant, Piet. Flitsende Ijzers, De geschiedenis van de schaatssport (Flashing Blades, the History of Dutch Speedskating). Zwolle, the Netherlands: La Rivière & Voorhoeve, 1967 (Second revised and expanded edition). (Dutch)
 _ Heya, Heya! Het nieuwe boek van de Schaatssport (Heya, Heya! The New book of Dutch Speedskating). Zwolle, the Netherlands: La Rivière & Voorhoeve, 1970. (Dutch)
 Peereboom, Klaas. Van Jaap Eden tot Ard Schenk (From Jaap Eden till Ard Schenk). Baarn, the Netherlands: De Boekerij, 1972. . (Dutch)
 Teigen, Magne. Komplette Resultater Internasjonale Mesterskap 1889 – 1989: Menn/Kvinner, Senior/Junior, allround/sprint. Veggli, Norway: WSSSA-Skøytenytt, 1989. (Norwegian)
 Van Eyle, Wim. Een Eeuw Nederlandse Schaatssport (A Century of Dutch Speedskating). Utrecht, the Netherlands: Uitgeverij Het Spectrum, 1982. . (Dutch)
 Witkamp, Anton and Koning, Dolf (eds.). Schaatsgoud '72 (Speedskating Gold '72). Bussum, the Netherlands: Teleboek NV, 1972. . (Dutch)

External links

 Kees Verkerk at SpeedSkatingStats.com
 
 

1942 births
Living people
Dutch male speed skaters
World record setters in speed skating
Olympic gold medalists for the Netherlands
Olympic medalists in speed skating
Olympic silver medalists for the Netherlands
Olympic speed skaters of the Netherlands
People from Binnenmaas
Speed skaters at the 1964 Winter Olympics
Speed skaters at the 1968 Winter Olympics
Speed skaters at the 1972 Winter Olympics
Medalists at the 1964 Winter Olympics
Medalists at the 1972 Winter Olympics
Medalists at the 1968 Winter Olympics
World Allround Speed Skating Championships medalists
Sportspeople from South Holland